Verkhneye Ishkarty is a rural locality (a selo) in Ishkartinsky Selsoviet, Buynaksky District, Republic of Dagestan, Russia. The population was 378 as of 2010. There are 14 streets.

Geography 
Verkhneye Ishkarty is located 15 km northwest of Buynaksk (the district's administrative centre) by road. Nizhneye Ishkarty is the nearest rural locality.

References 

Rural localities in Buynaksky District